Carinaro is a comune (municipality) in the Province of Caserta in the Italian region Campania, located about  north of Naples and about  southwest of Caserta.

Carinaro borders the following municipalities: Aversa, Gricignano di Aversa, Marcianise, Santa Maria Capua Vetere, Teverola.

References

Cities and towns in Campania